John DiRaimondo (born April 23, 1986 in St. Louis, Missouri) is an American soccer player.

Career

Youth
DiRaimondo went through an accelerated high school program at St. Louis University High that allowed him to graduate a year early alongside fellow soccer player and childhood friend Brian Grazier. While on the team, DiRaimondo lived in Florida and was roommates with Grazier. In 2003, he was named as the Parade Magazine All-American and competed in the McDonald's All-American game. DiRaimondo received Student-Athlete of the Year in 2001 and completed high school being on the honor roll all four years.

College
DiRaimondo attended St. Louis University; in 2003 he scored four goals and got ten assists while being named second-team NSCAA All-Midwest Region, and was named to the Virginia Adidas Classic All-Tournament team. In 2004, he scored four goals and got three assists while being named first team All-Conference. In 2005, he scored a career high of nine goals and ten assists while being named first team All-Conference and All-Region.  He also made it to the Hermann Trophy Watch list.  In his last year of college, DiRaimondo scored five goals and got five assists while being named a Hermann Trophy semifinalist. ESPN the Magazine named him Academic All-American. During his college years he also played with Chicago Fire Premier in the USL Premier Development League.

Professional
DiRaimondo was drafted by Major League Soccer's Colorado Rapids on January 18, 2007 and was drafted by Minnesota Thunder of the USL First Division on January 24, 2007. He made his debut for the Rapids on March 29, 2008, and scored his first professional goal the following week against the Kansas City Wizards.

DiRaimondo was waived by the Rapids on March 25, 2009,  and was signed to a developmental contract by D.C. United, on March 27, 2009. He was loaned to the Harrisburg City Islanders of the USL Second Division in April 2009 and later to Richmond Kickers in May 2009.

International
He was selected for the United States U-17 national team after his freshman year and managed to score two goals for the Under-17 World Cup qualifier in Guatemala. In 2003, he competed for the U.S. Under-17 National Team at the 2003 FIFA U-17 World Championship in Finland, and in 2004 played with the U.S. Under-20 National Team in a tour of Korea.

Honors

Richmond Kickers
USL Second Division Champions (1): 2009

References

External links
 
 SLU bio
 New talent puts hope to soccer team's horizon - Sports

1986 births
Living people
American soccer players
Chicago Fire U-23 players
Colorado Rapids players
D.C. United players
Richmond Kickers players
Penn FC players
American people of Italian descent
Parade High School All-Americans (boys' soccer)
Saint Louis Billikens men's soccer players
USL League Two players
USL Second Division players
Major League Soccer players
United States men's youth international soccer players
United States men's under-20 international soccer players
Colorado Rapids draft picks
Soccer players from Missouri
Association football midfielders